Bullet Boy is a 2004 British crime drama film directed by Saul Dibb, written by Saul Dibb and Catherine Johnson, and stars Ashley Walters. The film's original music was composed and performed by Robert Del Naja of Massive Attack, who released it as an album. The film is about a family in crime-ridden Hackney, East London, the eldest son's involvement in gun crime, and the effects of this on his younger brother.

Plot
Upon being released from prison, Ricky (Ashley Walters) is collected by Wisdom, an eccentric and naive friend who is desperate to establish himself within their neighbourhood. Immediately after arriving back, Wisdom accidentally breaks a wing mirror off a car belonging to a local gang member. The following confrontation leads to Ricky pulling away Wisdom in an attempt to keep peace. Wisdom later returns a gun to Ricky, who stores it within his bedroom, which is shared with his younger brother Curtis who finds the weapon and hides it away for his brother himself.

Wisdom hunts down the gang member, named Godfrey, for spreading word that he does not want to fight, and to get revenge shoots the Staffordshire bull terrier which Godfrey used to threaten Wisdom during the earlier altercation. As a result, Godfrey and his associate destroy Wisdom's car with a baseball bat and drive past his home shouting that he is "dead." Knowing that Godfrey would soon kill him otherwise, Wisdom tries to kill Godfrey. However, he fails and is seen by Godfrey.

As the two flee from here, Curtis accidentally shoots his friend Rio when Rio suggests they take the gun out and play with it. Their mother when she next sees Ricky, asks him to go home, pack his belongings and leave whilst they are at church to give Curtis a chance to avoid the gang lifestyle.

Just before heading home, he goes to Wisdom's house to get the money Wisdom told him to take before he left, only to find Wisdom dead, presumably at the hands of his rival, he leaves after sitting there for a long time thinking. As he packs his bags, he asks Curtis to go to the takeaway and get a kebab, and when Curtis returns, his brother has already left. As Ricky is waiting at the train station, mysterious hooded figures are appearing and closing in around Ricky.

As Ricky is about to run away, Godfrey comes out and shoots him six times in the chest. His body is later identified, and the film ends with Curtis reclaiming the gun from where he hid it and throwing it into the river.

Cast
Ashley Walters as Ricky
Luke Fraser as Curtis
Leon Black as Wisdom
Clare Perkins as Beverley
 Aaron Breakbeat Fagan as Drummer
 Curtis Walker as Leon

Awards and nominations

See also
Murder Mile
Life and Lyrics
Kidulthood
Adulthood
West 10 LDN
Top Boy
Sugarhouse

External links

2004 films
BBC Film films
Black British cinema
Black British films
Black British mass media
British crime drama films
2004 crime drama films
Hood films
British independent films
Films shot in London
Films set in London
Films directed by Saul Dibb
2004 directorial debut films
2000s English-language films
2000s British films